The 2018 European Fencing Championships was held in Novi Sad, Serbia from 16 to 21 June 2018 at the SPC Vojvodina.

Schedule

Medal summary

Men's events

Women's events

Medal table

Results

Men

Foil individual

Épée individual

Sabre individual

Foil team

Épée team

Sabre team

Women

Foil individual

Épée individual

Sabre individual

Foil team

Épée team

Sabre team

References

External links
Official website

European Fencing Championships
European Fencing Championships
International sports competitions hosted by Serbia
European Fencing Championships
Sport in Novi Sad
European Fencing Championships
Fencing in Serbia